Counter Culture is the debut EP by Australian music collective British India, released on 21 November 2005.

Track listing

Release history

References

British India (band) albums
2005 debut EPs